Lukas Märtens (born 27 December 2001) is a German swimmer. He competed in the 2020 Summer Olympics.

References

External links

2001 births
Living people
Sportspeople from Magdeburg
Swimmers at the 2020 Summer Olympics
German male swimmers
Olympic swimmers of Germany
World Aquatics Championships medalists in swimming
European Aquatics Championships medalists in swimming